The 4 × 100 metres freestyle relay was at Melbourne Sports and Aquatic Centre on 16 March. There was only one heat.

Final

Swimming at the 2006 Commonwealth Games